Revolt in the Big House is a 1958 American film noir directed by R. G. Springsteen and starring Gene Evans, Robert Blake and Timothy Carey.

Portions of the film were shot on location at Folsom State Prison in California.

Blacklisted screenwriter Daniel Lewis James was listed in the onscreen credits as Daniel Hyatt. In 1998 his credit was reinstated under his real name as the film's cowriter by the Writers Guild of America.

Plot

Cast
 Gene Evans as Lou Gannon
 Robert Blake as Rudy Hernandez
 Timothy Carey as Ed 'Bugsy' Kyle
 John Qualen as Doc
 Sam Edwards as Al Carey
 John Dennis as Red
 Walter Barnes as Guard Capt. Starkey
 Frank Richards as Jake
 Emile Meyer as Warden 
 Arline Hunter as Girl (as Arlene Hunter)

References

External links
 
 
 

1958 films
1958 crime drama films
American crime drama films
American black-and-white films
Film noir
Films directed by R. G. Springsteen
Allied Artists films
American prison drama films
1950s English-language films
1950s American films